Ramport Studios was a recording studio on Thessaly Road, Battersea, south London, owned by the Who. The studio was built in an old church hall. Several major albums were recorded at Ramport, including 1974's Crime of the Century by Supertramp and 1976's Jailbreak by Thin Lizzy. Judas Priest also recorded their album Sin After Sin there during 1976–1977. The Who's 1973 album Quadrophenia was recorded there. Johnny Thunders and the Heartbreakers spent much of the summer of 1977 recording and mixing the album L.A.M.F. there for the Who's label Track Records. Joan Jett recorded several tracks there which would end up on her Joan Jett album, later retitled Bad Reputation. Neil Young, together with Robbie Robertson, recorded the song "White Line" there in 1974; this was released on the album Homegrown in 2020.

Virgin Studios Ltd. acquired the studio in 1994 and renamed it Town House Three. It is now used as a doctor's surgery.

References

The Who
Recording studios in London